Rip Roaring Riley is a 1935 American action film directed by Elmer Clifton and starring Elmer Clifton and starring Lloyd Hughes, Marion Burns and Grant Withers. The film's sets were designed by the art director Vin Taylor. A second feature, it was released in America by Puritan Pictures and in Britain by Pathé Pictures under the alternative title The Mystery of Diamond Island.

Synopsis
A federal agent manages to crash land on Diamond Island, where the government suspects that Major Gray is developing a new poison gas, by forcing Professor Baker and his daughter Anne to work for him.

Cast
 Lloyd Hughes as 	Ted 'Rip-Roaring' Riley
 Marion Burns as Anne Baker
 Grant Withers as Major Gray
 John Cowell as Professor Baker
 Paul Ellis as Franko - Henchman
 Eddie Gribbon as Sparko - Henchman
 Kit Guard as 	Bruno - Henchman
 Joe Hirakawa as Lun - Houseboy
 Wilfred Lucas as Police Chief

References

Bibliography
 Langman, Larry. Return to Paradise: A Guide to South Sea Island Films. Scarecrow Press, 1998.
 Pitts, Michael R. Poverty Row Studios, 1929–1940. McFarland & Company, 2005.

External links
 

1935 films
1935 crime films
1930s English-language films
1930s crime action films
American crime action films
Films directed by Elmer Clifton
American black-and-white films
1930s American films